Anna Coleman Watts Ladd (July 15, 1878 – June 3, 1939) was an American sculptor in Manchester, Massachusetts, who devoted her time and skills throughout World War I to designing prosthetics for soldiers who were disfigured from injuries received in combat.

Biography
Anna Coleman Watts was born in Bryn Mawr, Pennsylvania and educated in Europe, where she studied sculpture in Paris and Rome. She married Dr. Maynard Ladd in Salisbury England and then moved to Boston.  She studied with Bela Pratt for three years at the Boston Museum School. Her Triton Babies piece was shown at the 1915 Panama-Pacific Exposition in San Francisco. (It is now a fountain sculpture in the Boston Public Garden.) In 1914, she was founding member of the Guild of Boston Artists and exhibited in both the opening show and the traveling exhibition that followed and where later she held a one-woman show. She completed other works with mythological characters, and these pieces continue to surface and are sold in auctions today.

Ladd challenged herself on many artistic fronts and wrote two books, Hieronymus Rides, based on a medieval romance she worked on for years and The Candid Adventurer, a sendup of Boston society in 1913. She also wrote at least two unproduced plays; one of which incorporated the story of a female sculptor who goes to war.

She devoted herself to portraiture and was well regarded. Her portrait of Eleanora Duse was one of only three that the actress ever allowed. In late 1917, her husband, Dr. Maynard Ladd was appointed to direct the Children's Bureau of the American Red Cross in Toul. Anna stayed on the homefront, but, in her search for ways to help the war effort, she learned about the work of Francis Derwent Wood in London. He developed lifelike masks to help soldiers with facial deformities. She contacted him and together they improved upon the mask techniques. She applied for permission to go to France to work with the soldiers there, but had to receive special permission from Gen. Pershing to do so, as it was forbidden for husbands and wives to serve in war zones at the same time. She received permission and worked with the American Red Cross to go to France. in the Masks for Facial Disfigurement Department in Paris. Ladd founded the American Red Cross "Studio for Portrait-Masks" to provide cosmetic masks to be worn by men who had been badly disfigured in World War I. Her services earned her the Légion d'Honneur Croix de Chevalier and the Serbian Order of Saint Sava.

After World War I, she depicted a decayed corpse on a barbed wire fence for a war memorial commissioned by the Manchester-by-the-Sea American Legion. In 1936, Ladd retired with her husband to California, where she died in 1939. She was survived by her daughters, Gabriella May Ladd, who was the second wife of Kyra Sedgwick's paternal great-grandfather and Vernon Abbott Ladd who died in 1970.

Her sculpture Triton Babies (shown) is featured on the Boston Women's Heritage Trail.

Ladd's prosthetic work
Soldiers would come to Ladd's studio to have a cast made of their face and their features sculpted onto clay or plasticine. This form was then used to construct the prosthetic piece from extremely thin galvanized copper. The metal was painted with hard enamel to resemble the recipient's skin tone. Ladd used real hair to create the eyelashes, eyebrows and mustaches. The prosthesis was attached to the face by strings or eyeglasses as the prosthetics created in Francis Derwent Wood's "Tin Noses Shop" were.

In 1932, the French Government honored her as a Knight (Chevalier) of the Legion of Honour, in recognition of the work she'd done.

Ladd’s work is now called anaplastology. Anaplastology is the art, craft, and science of restoring absent or malformed anatomy through artificial means. In the Smithsonian magazine February 2007 article, "Rivaling Nature", Erin Donaldson, an anaplastologist in Beverly, MA, was interviewed by Caroline Alexander for a present-day perspective on the purpose and benefits of facial prosthetics for patients in civilian sectors, as well as soldiers returning from the Iraq War.

Notes

References
 Anna Coleman Ladd papers, 1881–1950. Archives of American Art, Smithsonian Institution.
 Anna Coleman Ladd (1878–1939), by Karen Tenney-Loring
 Alexander, Caroline (2007). "Faces of War". Smithsonian, February 2007, pp. 72–80.

External links
 Anna Coleman Ladd Papers at the Smithsonian's Archives of American Art

1878 births
1939 deaths
American women in World War I
People from Manchester-by-the-Sea, Massachusetts
Chevaliers of the Légion d'honneur
Recipients of the Order of St. Sava
Sculptors from Massachusetts
20th-century American sculptors
20th-century American women artists